Copceac may refer to:

Copceac, Gagauzia, a commune in Gagauzia, Moldova
Copceac, Ştefan Vodă, a commune in Ştefan Vodă district, Moldova

See also
Kipchak (disambiguation)